Margit Rösler is a German mathematician known for her research in harmonic analysis, special functions, and Dunkl operators. She is a professor of mathematics at Paderborn University.

Rösler earned a diploma in mathematics with distinction from the Technical University of Munich in 1988. She completed her PhD at the same university in 1992. Her dissertation, Durch orthogonale trigonometrische Systeme auf dem Einheitskreis induzierte Faltungsstrukturen auf , was jointly supervised by Rupert Lasser and Elmar Thoma.

She remained at TU Munich as a postdoctoral researcher and assistant professor, earning a habilitation in 1999. Her habilitation thesis was Contributions to the theory of Dunkl operators.
She was a lecturer at the University of Göttingen from 2000 until 2004. Then, after short-term positions at the University of Amsterdam and Technische Universität Darmstadt, and a professorship at the Clausthal University of Technology, she took her present position at Paderborn University in 2012.

References

External links
Home page

Year of birth missing (living people)
Living people
20th-century German mathematicians
German women mathematicians
Technical University of Munich alumni
Academic staff of the Technical University of Munich
Academic staff of the University of Göttingen
Academic staff of Technische Universität Darmstadt
21st-century German mathematicians
Academic staff of the Clausthal University of Technology
20th-century German women
21st-century German women